Manoba lilliptiana is a moth in the family Nolidae. It was described by Hiroshi Inoue in 1998. It is found in Nepal and Thailand (most studied specimens come from the Northern mountainous region).

References

Moths described in 1998
Nolinae